The Allensville Historic District, along Kentucky Route 102/Main St. in Allensville, Kentucky, is a  historic district which was listed on the National Register of Historic Places in 1988.  The listing included 40 contributing buildings and one contributing structure.

It includes three churches, of which Allensville United Methodist Church (1867) is the oldest.  It may also be the oldest surviving building in Allensville.

References

National Register of Historic Places in Todd County, Kentucky
Historic districts on the National Register of Historic Places in Kentucky
Queen Anne architecture in Kentucky
Buildings and structures completed in 1860